The sixth season of The Great Canadian Baking Show premiered on CBC Television on October 2, 2022. As with previous seasons, ten amateur bakers will compete over eight weeks of challenges, vying for the title. Ann Pornel and Alan Shane Lewis return for their third season as hosts. Bruno Feldeisen and Kyla Kennaley return for their sixth and fourth seasons respectively as judges.

Bakers

Results summary

Episodes
 Baker eliminated
 Star Baker
 Winner

Episode 1: Cake Week
For their first signature challenge, the bakers were given two hours to create a dozen friand cakes with a nut flour of their choice. For the technical challenge, the bakers had an hour and 45 minutes to make a Bolo de rolo, a Brazilian dessert, consisting of thin layers of dough wrapped with a layer of guava paste. For the showstopper, the bakers had three hours and 45 minutes to make a Kawaii cake - a cake decorated using the Japanese Kawaii trend.

Episode 2: Biscuit and Bar Week
For their second signature challenge, the bakers were given two hours to create twelve meringue bars with a cookie base, a choice of filling and a meringue top. For the technical challenge, the bakers had two hours to make 36 Alfajores, with a thick gooey layer of dulce de leche, sandwiched between two cookies. The contestants had to make 2 versions, 18 chocolate alfajores and 18 vanilla alfajores. For the showstopper, the bakers had four hours to make a fairytale scene made out of cookies.

Episode 3: Bread Week
For their third signature challenge, the bakers were given one hour and 45 minutes to bake a flatbread with a filling of their choice. For the technical challenge the bakers had two hours to make a Swedish Tea Ring, a sweet yeasted dough flavoured with cinnamon and cardamom, filled with raisins and twisted into a ring. For the showstopper the bakers had four hours to create "a bread work of art inspired by any artist, style or movement."

Episode 4: Botanical Week
For their fourth signature challenge, the bakers were given one hour and 45 minutes to bake a dozen pressed flower sandwich cookies. For the technical challenge the bakers had one hour and 45 minutes to make 16 Chebakia, pastry made of strips of dough rolled to resemble a rose, deep-fried until golden, then coated with a syrup made of honey and orange blossom water and sprinkled with sesame. For the showstopper, the bakers had four hours to create an illusion cake, inspired by botanical themes.

Episode 5: Chocolate Week

For their Signature Challenge, the six remaining bakers were given two hours 15 minutes to make eight chocolate-centric ice cream sandwiches showcasing homemade ice cream between two soft cookies, featuring any flavour they see like, as long as chocolate has a starring role. In the Technical challenge, they had to recreate Kyla's favourite cake, sacher torte, the famed Viennese specialty with two layers of chocolate sponge, a layer of apricot jam, and a shiny dark chocolate glaze, all in two hours 15 minutes. In the Showstopper, they had three hours 15 minutes to create a 3D chocolate reveal, with a hidden dessert cloaked in a chocolate shell.

Episode 6: Pastry Week

For the Signature Challenge the five remaining bakers are given two hours to make eight Hungarian Chimney Cakes or Kürtőskalács. These are coiled pastries rolled in a sweet topping then baked. Traditionally chimney cakes are baked over a spit and are hollow but the bakers are required to include a yummy filling of their choice. In the Technical Challenge they had two hours to create a Mango Rose Tart, composed of a crumbly shortcut pastry, a tangy mango curd, and luscious creme diplomat. Topping the tart are freshly sliced mangoes arranged in a rose pattern and mango caviar. This is a modern take on a classic French Tarte Aux Pommes. For the Showstopper, they had four hours to make a baklava tower. A popular Middle Eastern dessert, baklava is a gooey, nutty multi-layer pastry made with phyllo. The bakers must make their own phyllo dough and create two types of baklava for their towers.

Episode 7: Fancy Dessert Week

For the Signature Challenge, the four remaining bakers were given two hours to make ten mochi donuts. In the Technical Challenge, they had two hours to create a sans rival, a Filipino take on a dacquoise, using cashews instead of hazelnuts. For the Showstopper, they had four and a half hours to make a Jelly Art Cake, featuring personalized art encased in transparent gelatin as part of a cake with traditional layers of sponge, mousse, and ganache.

Episode 8: Finale
In the Signature Challenge, the bakers were given two hours and 15 minutes to create a Paris-brest, with their choice of either sweet or savoury flavours and fillings.  In the Technical Challenge, they had two and a half hours to make a cassata siciliana, a sponge cake with ricotta and chocolate chip filling, decorated with trapezoidal pistachio marzipan, royal icing, and topped with candied fruit. For the final Showstopper, the bakers had to create a garden party dessert centrepiece, composed of at least three bakes, within four and a half hours.

References

6
2022 Canadian television seasons